Eulimella ejuncida is a species of sea snail, a marine gastropod mollusk in the family Pyramidellidae, the pyrams and their allies.

Distribution
This marine species occurs in the Atlantic Ocean off Southeast Brasil.

References

 Pimenta, A.D., Santos, F.N. & Absalao, R.S., 2011. - Taxonomic revision of the genus Eulimella (Gastropoda, Pyramidellidae) from Brazil, with description of three new species. Zootaxa 3063: 22-38

External links
 To World Register of Marine Species

ejuncida
Gastropods described in 2011